conDiT (acronym of “Concerts of Technological District”) was a musical creation platform founded in Buenos Aires on 28 October 2011.

Origins

conDIT [buenos aires technological district's concerts] was a creation platform of concert music, in other words, the new 'classical music' made in the 2010s.

Around conDIT, since its foundation in 2011, more than sixty national and international activities has been produced, including workshops, concerts, artistic residencies and tours, a semestral magazine called Espiral, spreading the musical thinking of musicians participating in the platform, more than thirty commissions, 4 call for works, and a media open access repository.
Since the idea of its founder of creating an independent platform for long-term musical projects, several artists actively participated in the growth and management of the platform. Among others, Bruno Mesz, Fernando Manassero, Rosa Nolly, José Rafael Subía Valdez, Virginia Chacon Dorr, Juan Marco Litrica, Roberto Maqueda, Tatiana Cuoco, Ramiro Iturrioz, Andrea Farina, Daniel Halaban, Florencia Curci, Javier Areal Velez, Rodrigo Gallegos Pinto and Lucas Giono.

Activities between 2011 – 2014
Between 2011 and 2013 seventeen commissioned Works, from national and international artists, has been premiered. Among the most remarkable achievements can be listed: nine music works commissioned to new composers, six workshops for residents and external participants, six “Espiral” journal publications, and numerous digital texts. conDiT was also hosted the International Gaudeamus Competition Muziekweek (Netherlands).

Many national and international musicians and ensembles participated in conDiT’s concerts, among which can be mentioned: the double-bass row from the Teatro Colón Orchestra, the French horn player Delphine Gaulthier Guiche, the cellist Martín Devoto, Manos a las Obras duo (formed by the pianist Haydée Schvartz and the violinist Elías Gurevich) Modelo62 ensemble (Netherlands), suono mobile ensemble (Córdoba, Argentina), Nonsense vocal ensemble, the experimental music duo Cilantro, the composer Martin Tellinga (Netherlands), and the Institute of Sonology of The Hague.

The events and concerts performed are closely articulated with a formative and relational instance, addressed both to the public and to the artists, and that is reflected in the multiple activities that surround the performances.

For this purpose conDiT organizes lectures, seminars, and workshops aimed to create opportunities for local and international artistas to share their experiences and knowledge. Among the most remarkable actions can be listed: Delphine Gauthier- Guiche seminar (2013- UNQUI), reConvert Project seminar (2013 - cheLA), Minka 1 (2013-cheLA) and Minka 2 (2013-cheLA).

In 2014 conDiT received two international artists in residence: the Austrian composer Christine Schorkhuber (performance and installation in March); and the Japanese composer Reiko Yamada (installation in August). The residence of German artist Noid is scheduled for December, he will present an installation and concert pieces.

Transatlantic Interscores, performed in August in Vienna, was the first international conDiT concert with the participation of the Spanish percussion duo ReConvert Project.

In November conDiT produced the concert Escrituras Argentinas, with the support of the Ciclo de Música Contemporánea del Teatro General San Martín. The concert included works commissioned by the platform. The artists selected were Pablo Araya, Fernando Manassero, Luciano Azzigotti, and Valentin Pelisch.

Special Projects

Espiral

Espiral is a biannual magazine in which artists, critics, and organizers involved in conDiT manifest their reflections and reviews about the works and activities developed under the management of the platform. Some articles by authors specialized in different areas within the music field (and its relationship with other arts) are occasionally included. Espiral also works as playbill concerts, providing a reflective framework for the performances. Some of the authors who participated in Espiral are: Luciano Azzigotti, Luciano Kulikov, Ezequiel Dobrovsky, Fernando Manassero, Ezequiel Menalled, Gabriel Paiuk, Dick Raaijmakers, Martjin Tellinga, Eduardo Spinelli and Nicolaus A. Huber.
Related to conDiT’s artistic proposal, the content of Espiral is based on a multidisciplinary esthetic program.  This relationship is materialized through the involvement of different artists to generate de audiovisual material for each publication. Among the visual who participated in Espiral are: Tomás Rawski, Diego Alberti, and Ananke Assef.

taPeTe (Technological Performance Atelier)

taPeTe was created to fulfill the contemporary music’s need for a theater that can be configured to meet diverse purposes. The graduation of the acoustic ranks of absorption and diffusion in three defined spectral bands, helps the space to meet the requirement of traditional concert pieces. They require a high level of definition and sound customization.
In taPeTe can also be performed acoustic pieces for instruments which require very specific space conditions, but can also be adapted to performances which require the use of extended materials. Finally, on the auditorium can be developed instrumental and scenographic workshops, aimed to provide a space to fulfill luthiers’ and composers’ needs.
In every Project the artists are able to use the space and manage it in totally different ways, offering different experiencies from the traditional ones – not only in theatrical but also in spatial terms. In taPeTe can also be performed contemporary pieces that can not be displayed in any other conventional space.

Minka

 

Minka is a pre-Columbian tradition of volunteer work, in which the members of a community work for the advantage of the whole group. In some áreas the Minka is still relevant today.
Based on this concept, keeping in mind the idea the creation of a cooperative working method, the composers Luciano Azzigotti, Fernando Manassero and Rafael Subía Valdez designed a composing system under the name of Minka.

The first Minka was done in cooperation with the assembles Modelo62 (resident at Condit in April 2013) and the Contemporary Music Ensemble of the Department of Performing Arts IUNA,
The cooperative composition system consisted of a working day to create and assemble a piece from scratch, under five pre-set slogans organized in five phases.

The second Minka took place in October 2013 with suono mobile Argentina, a contemporary music ensemble from Cordoba (resident at conDiT) in cooperation with Contemporary Music Ensemble of the Department of Performing Arts IUNA.

Container 
In Argentina there is a tradition related to classical concert music, in which the programmers and regisseurs of Argentine concert halls receive (with the support of embassies) top level foreign artists who spread the music of their countries in Argentina.
This project has the clear objective to generate a mutual opportunity, so Argentine composers and musicians can spread their work abroad within an integrated broadcasting, recording, and international artists’ exchange program; framed by the principle of equal opportunities. The purpose is: update the old "center-periphery" relationship, energizing and encouraging the symmetry of cultural exchange between Argentina and the world.
The first chapter of Container is possible thanks to the collaboration between the Embassy of Argentina and conDiT.cheLA, whose team will be in charge of the organization, choice of repertoire and residents, commission works, and the activities advertising.
This project will be carried out by groups and halls in Vienna and Graz, associated with conDiT, and will be the second step after the partnerships we have begun in 2014 with the reception of Austrian artists in our platform.
During 2015 conDiT will form an ensemble in Vienna with young professional musicians. The ensemble will premiere works by Argentine young composers, programmed for the second Container concert (the first antecedent is Transatlantic Interscores, July 2014) on December 10.

Church organ's restoration

During 2015 conDiT will be in charge of stages 2 and 3 of the restoration of the San Antonio de Padua church’s organ. This action crystallizes the commitment of the platform with the practice and exercise of the collective memory in Parque Patricios.
The restoration of an instrument transcends individual possibilities, it is always a call to the collective voice. Like bells announcing the moments of meeting, provide sound awareness to abandoned instruments allows us to hear and participate in rituals, and prefigure new ones, updating the exercise of our poetic consciousness that drives us to root ourselves and transcend.
With the different impacts of technological waves, the customs of the music’s functions have changed especially in the last century. We are surrounded by an invisible past that deserves to be reborn from silenced voices. This not only means restoring an instrument, but after that restore the memories of those organists who made music that triggers fervor, beliefs, and wills.

Commissioned works  

 * in co-production with Teatro Argentino de La Plata and the kindly support of Ernst Von Siemens Musikstiftung

Cronology of concerts

2011 

 Música Rusa y Argentina
 Electrónica Inestable
 Epinicios y Agonales

2012 

 This is my conDiTion
 Cosas extendidas
 Music of Taste
 Delphine Gauthier Guiche

2013 

 Martin Devoto
 Minka1
  conDiT | Gaudeamus Muzikweek | Modelo62 Composition Award final stage
 Modelo62
 Institute of Sonoloy, Den Haag
 Martijn Tellinga
 Martin Devoto & Delphine Gauthier Guiche
 reConvert Project | Latinoamerican Tour
 reConvert Project @TACEC Teatro Argentino de La Plata
 reConvert Project | Percussion's workshop works of participants
 Córdoba en Buenos Aires | Suonomobile Argentina 
 Minka2
 Manos a las obras | Haydée Schvartz y Elías Gurevich

2014 

 Traces of the unpresent present or the present unpresent | Christine Schörkhuber
 Akousmatikon
 Expanded Voices
 Marcelo Toledo seminar and flute works
 Transatlantic Interscores | Viena
 Transatlantic Interscores | Darmstadt
 Tañidos | Bruno Lo Bianco y Sebastian Pereira
 Reflective | Reiko Yamada [Instalación y residencia]
 Ensamble DAMus IUNA
 Escrituras Argentinas [coproducción con el Cíclo de Música Contemporánea del TGSM]
 Noid [Au]

2015 
 Ensamble Tropi
Microtunings
 conDiT LAB 1
 Heloisa Amaral & Karin Hellqvist
conDIT.scime [expanded music concerts serie]
Rei Nakamura
 Michael Maierhof | Solo
 Nadar Ensemble
 Infinite Land

2016 
 Andreas Trobollowitsch
 Divka trio | Music & Cinema
 MEI Music for flutes
 reConvert project
 Ensamble Coral Cámara Siglo XXI

2017 
New Music for organ

Press  
 «el conDIT, una forma de llevar la música al barrio / TELAM, 30 de Agosto de 2013 », by Agustín Argento, in:.
 «Semana de conciertos en el Distrito Tecnológico | La Nación ADN 26 de abril de 2013 », by Natalia Blanc, in: .
 «Desde Holanda, un ciclo de música contemporánea: Ensamble Modelo62 / La Nación / 24 de abril de 2013», by Pablo Gianera, in: .
 «Operación Escuchar: La notable movida en el cheLA / Página 12 Suplemento NO, 16 de mayo de 2013», by Santiago Rial Ungaro, in: .
 «El Ensamble Modelo62 en Buenos Aires | Un debut con conciertos y concurso / Página 12 Espectáculos 24 de abril de 2013
», in: .

 «Vanguardias criollas e Ideología Ruidista | Concierto Escrituras Argentinas en el auditorio cheLA / Diario Clarín 12 Opinión 21 de noviembre de 2014
», in: .

External links 
 conDiT, in: . 
 cheLA, in: . 
 Espiral, in : 
 YouTube, in :

References

Concert halls in Argentina
Culture in Buenos Aires
Argentine music